Hasti Dal Shah or Hastidal Shah was an ancient warrior at Anglo-Nepalese war from the family of Shah Dynasty of Gorkha. He was called upon as an able commander in the Almora Front during the Anglo-Nepalese war. His death caused the ultimate fall of Gorkha forces in Almora.

Background
He was born to Birbaha Shah. He was grandson of Sri Sri Sri Maharaj Adhirajkumar  Chandrarup Shah, 4th son of King Prithvipati Shah of Gorkha. His three brothers were Governor Bam Shah, Dilip Shah, and Rudra Bir Shah.

Life and Death
At Anglo-Nepalese war, his brother Bam Shah was the governor of Kumaun. He arrived Almoda with a small body of reinforcements. Furthermore four companies were sent from Kathmandu to aid beleaguered defences of Kumaun which were delayed. Hastidal and 500 Nepalese Army men moved from Almoda to secure Almoda's Northern Line of communications with Kathmandu. This party was intercepted. Hastidal, the ablest commander was killed at the first moments of the attack.

References

Year of birth missing
Year of death missing
Anglo-Nepalese War
Nepalese military personnel
Nepalese military personnel killed in action
Shah dynasty